The "Paraguayan National Anthem" is the national anthem of Paraguay. The lyrics were written by Francisco Acuña de Figueroa (who also wrote "Orientales, la Patria o la tumba", the national anthem of Uruguay) under the presidency of Carlos Antonio López, who at the time delegated Bernardo Jovellanos and Anastasio González to ask Figueroa to write the anthem (Jovellanos and González were commissioners of the Paraguayan government in Uruguay).

History
The lyrics to the song were officially finished by Francisco Acuña de Figueroa on May 20, 1846.

It still remains unclear who was responsible for the creation of the music. Some sources claim that Frenchman Francisco Sauvageot de Dupuis was the composer, while others claim it to be the work of the Hungarian-born Francisco José Debali (Debály Ferenc József), who composed the music for the Uruguayan national anthem. What it is known for sure is that it was the Paraguayan composer Remberto Giménez who in 1933 arranged and developed the version of the national anthem that remains in use by Paraguay today.

Lyrics 
Though the national anthem has many verses, usually only the first verse followed by the chorus are sung on most occasions. Due to the song's length, the wordless introductory section and the latter half of the first verse are often omitted for brevity when the national anthem is played before a sporting event such as a soccer game.

References

External links
Paraguay: Paraguayos, República o Muerte - Audio of the national anthem of Paraguay, with information and lyrics (archive link)
MP3 file
Paraguayos

National symbols of Paraguay
Paraguayan music
Paraguay
Spanish-language songs
Paraguay
National anthem compositions in F major